Air Tchad, or Air Chad, was a Chadian airline that operated domestic and regional services, as well as charter flights to neighbouring countries in Central and West Africa and charter cargo services to France, Italy and Saudi Arabia.

History
UTA provided the airline with technical and operational assistance. Operations started on 4 August the same year, replacing services formerly provided by Air Afrique.

Flown with one Baron, one Cherokee Six, two DC-3s and one DC-4, at  Air Tchad operated a domestic route network that included Abecher, Abou Deia, Am Timan, Ati, Bokoro, Bol, Bongor, Faya Largeau, Fort Archambault, Mongo, Moundou, Ndjamena, Oum Hadjer and Pala, along with an international flight to Geneina in Sudan. Ten years later, the domestic route network had reduced to include Abecher, Mongo, Moundou, Ndjamena, and Sarh, with flights to Bangui in the Central African Republic and Geneina also undertaken; a single Fokker F27-500 served the entire network.

In the 1990s, the Chadian government boosted its shareholding in the airline to 98%, with UTA's participation being reduced to 2%.

See also
 List of defunct airlines of Chad
 Transport in Chad

Notes and references

References

Bibliography

Airlines established in 1966
Defunct airlines of Chad
1966 establishments in Chad